The Canadian SF and Fantasy Association Hall of Fame Trophy is an award given to Canadian science fiction and fantasy writers for their contributions over their entire career, and is presented as part of the Aurora Awards. The award was first given out as the Lifetime Achievement Award in 1980. Its name changed to the Hall of Fame Trophy in 2014.

Winners and nominees

* Winners and joint winners

Nomination list

The nominees list is evaluated by the jury every year, including any received that year, and any for previous years.

References

External links
Hall of Fame at the Canadian Science Fiction & Fantasy Association

Aurora Awards
Awards established in 1980
Canadian literary awards
Lifetime achievement awards
Canadian science fiction awards